Geir-Ketil Hansen (born 13 March 1956 in Narvik) is a Norwegian politician for the Socialist Left Party.

He was elected to the Norwegian Parliament from Nordland in 2001, but was not re-elected in 2005. He served in the position of deputy representative during the terms 1989–1993 and 2005–2009.

On the local level Hansen was a member of the executive committee of Narvik municipal council from 1979 to 1987. From 1999 to 2001 and 2005 to 2011 he was a member of Nordland county cabinet.

Since 2006 he works at the Office of the Auditor General of Norway.

References

1956 births
Living people
Members of the Storting
Nordland politicians
Socialist Left Party (Norway) politicians
People from Narvik
Telemark University College alumni
21st-century Norwegian politicians